The 2022 Gulf 12 Hours was the 12th edition of the Gulf 12 Hours, and was held at Yas Marina Circuit on 9–11 December 2022. The race was contested with GT3-spec cars and Porsche 992 Cup spec cars. It was the final round of the 2022 Intercontinental GT Challenge, replacing the Kyalami 9 Hours. This was the first of a trio of Gulf-based events promoted by the Driving Force Events (DFE).

Teams and drivers

Notes

References

External links 
 

Gulf
Gulf
Gulf 12 Hours